is an administrative and postal area of Chiyoda, Tokyo, Japan. It was formerly Kanda-ku.

Many establishments are located in Hitotsubashi. In Hitotsubashi 1-chōme are the headquarters of the Mainichi Shimbun. In 2-chōme are Hitotsubashi University Chiyoda Campus, Josuikaikan Hall, alumni hall of Hitotsubashi University, Kyoritsu Women's University, Iwanami Shoten, Shogakukan, and Shueisha, as well as Hitotsubashi Group.

Education

 operates public elementary and junior high schools. Ochanomizu Elementary School (お茶の水小学校) is the zoned elementary school for Hitotsubashi 1-2 chōme.

There is a freedom of choice system for junior high schools in Chiyoda Ward, and so there are no specific junior high school zones. Chiyoda Ward operates Chiyoda Kanda Hitotsubashi Junior High School (千代田区立神田一橋中学校) in Hitotsubashi.

References

Districts of Chiyoda, Tokyo
Kanda, Tokyo